Fedor Grigoryevich Solntsev ( – ) was a Russian painter and historian of art. His artwork was a major contribution in recording and preserving medieval Russian culture, which was a common subject of his paintings. He was the main author of the fundamental work , the main decorator of interiors of the Grand Kremlin Palace in Moscow. He discovered and restored mosaics and frescoes of Saint Sophia Cathedral, Kyiv and Cathedral of the Dormition of Kyiv Pechersk Lavra in Kyiv, and of Cathedral of Saint Demetrius in Vladimir.

Fedor Solntsev, together with Metropolitan Philaret and Archimandrite Photius are considered the founders of modern Russian icon painting canon synthesizing ancient Russian traditions, post-Petrine efforts and modern art discoveries.

Biography
Fedor Solntsev was born in  a village near Rybinsk in the Yaroslavl Governorate. His parents were serfs of Count . His father, Grigory Konstantinovich Solntsev, worked as a box-office attendant for the Imperial theaters in Saint Petersburg and travelled to the village very infrequently while his mother, Elizaveta Frolovna Solntseva, was a peasant and lived all her life in the village. Fedor spent his early life with his mother and siblings. After discovering his artistic ability, his master freed the Solntsev family, which allowed Fedor to enter the Imperial Academy of Arts in Saint Petersburg in 1815 and became a pupil of Alexei Yegorov and Stepan Shchukin. Later, Fedor's younger brother, Yegor Solntsev also graduated from the Imperial Academy of Art and became a notable painter.

Fedor graduated from the Academy in 1824 receiving a "Lesser Gold Medal" for his painting A Peasant Family. In 1827 he received the "Greater Gold Medal" from the Academy for his painting Render unto Caesar. In 1836 he became a member of the Imperial Academy of Arts for his work Meeting of Grand Duke Sviatoslav with John of Tzimiskes. In 1876 Solntsev was appointed Professor of the Academy.

Fedor Solntsev's work was supported by the President of Imperial Academy of Arts Alexey Olenin and Emperor Nicholas I. The Emperor commissioned Solntsev to decorate dinner parties and embellish his private apartments in the Kremlin. Through his life Solntsev worked on restoration of many Moscow Kremlin buildings including the Grand Kremlin Palace and Kremlin Armoury. He painted Cathedral of Christ the Saviour and other churches in Moscow. Solntsev also worked in Kyiv with restoration and describing artefacts of Kyiv Pechersk Lavra. He painted the interiors of the    there.

Olenin commissioned Solntsev to describe archaeological and historical artifacts of Russian state. Solntsev started to work in 1830. He made more than 3000 highly detailed drawing of different artifacts including the record of all the Kremlin's riches. Seven hundreds of those drawings made the core for the six-volume publications titled Antiquities of the Russian State. The encyclopedia was published after Olenin's death using the funds provided by Nicholas I. Solntsev also provided a detailed chronicle of Old Russian style in his book Clothing of Russia.

Solntsev died on 3 March 1892 and was buried in Volkovo Cemetery in Saint Petersburg.

References

Further reading
 
 
 
  Reprint publication of Solntsev's masterpiece
 
 

1801 births
1892 deaths
People from Yaroslavl Oblast
People from Mologsky Uyezd
19th-century painters from the Russian Empire
Russian male painters
19th-century historians from the Russian Empire
19th-century male artists from the Russian Empire
Members of the Imperial Academy of Arts